Waiake is one of the northernmost suburbs of the North Shore, in Auckland, New Zealand. It is located in the East Coast Bays between the suburbs of Browns Bay to the south and Torbay to the north. It has a beach (named Waiake Beach), which looks out to the Tor, a presque-isle at the north end of the beach that becomes an island at high tide. Waiake is under the local governance of the Auckland Council.

Demographics

Waiake had a population of 3,885 at the 2018 New Zealand census, an increase of 165 people (4.4%) since the 2013 census, and an increase of 270 people (7.5%) since the 2006 census. There were 1,299 households, comprising 1,911 males and 1,974 females, giving a sex ratio of 0.97 males per female. The median age was 39.0 years (compared with 37.4 years nationally), with 726 people (18.7%) aged under 15 years, 771 (19.8%) aged 15 to 29, 1,827 (47.0%) aged 30 to 64, and 561 (14.4%) aged 65 or older.

Ethnicities were 81.7% European/Pākehā, 4.9% Māori, 1.9% Pacific peoples, 14.9% Asian, and 2.9% other ethnicities. People may identify with more than one ethnicity.

The percentage of people born overseas was 46.1, compared with 27.1% nationally.

Although some people chose not to answer the census's question about religious affiliation, 54.0% had no religion, 37.0% were Christian, 0.2% had Māori religious beliefs, 0.7% were Hindu, 0.5% were Muslim, 0.6% were Buddhist and 1.8% had other religions.

Of those at least 15 years old, 981 (31.1%) people had a bachelor's or higher degree, and 300 (9.5%) people had no formal qualifications. The median income was $41,000, compared with $31,800 nationally. 831 people (26.3%) earned over $70,000 compared to 17.2% nationally. The employment status of those at least 15 was that 1,668 (52.8%) people were employed full-time, 501 (15.9%) were part-time, and 96 (3.0%) were unemployed.

References

Suburbs of Auckland
North Shore, New Zealand
Beaches of the Auckland Region
East Coast Bays